Verena Hartmann (born 29 March 1974) is a German politician formerly of the Alternative for Germany (AfD) party, and since 2017, a member of the Bundestag, the federal legislative body.

Life and politics

Hartmann was born 1974 in the East German town of Räckelwitz and became a police commissioner in 2002.

Hartmann entered the AfD in 2016 and became after the 2017 German federal election member of the Bundestag.

References

Living people
1974 births
People from Bautzen (district)
Members of the Bundestag for Saxony
Members of the Bundestag 2017–2021
Members of the Bundestag for the Alternative for Germany